Sanjaya Wanasinghe RSP VSV USP ndu is a Major General of Sri Lanka Army. He is the 50th Commandant of the Sri Lanka Army Volunteer Force. Prior to join here, he served as the Commander, Security Forces Headquarters Mullaitivu. He is also Colonel Commandant of the Sri Lanka Artillery Regiment.

Military career 
W A S S Wanasinghe commission with the Sri Lanka Artillery Regiment. He served as Director General of Directorate of Overseas Operations. He has been elevated to Major General with effect from 2 June 2020. He also served as Adjutant General of Sri Lankan Army. His father, General Hamilton Wanasinghe, the 11th Commander of the Army (1988-1991) was in office who was also afterwards promoted as the country-produced first 4 Star General.

References 

Living people
Sri Lankan major generals
Sinhalese military personnel
Year of birth missing (living people)